Daniele Fioretti (born 19 December 1990) is an Italian footballer who plays as a forward for SSD Sasso Marconi Zola in Serie D.

Career
Born in Umbertide, the Province of Perugia, Umbria, Fioretti started his career at Pontevecchio, a Serie D club located in Ponte San Giovanni, a frazione of the city of Perugia. In January 2008 he was signed by Genoa. Fioretti was excluded from pre-season call-up for Pontevecchio in 2008–09 Serie D, which soon after he was reinstated but only played 9 times for the first team. Fioretti was also suspended 6 games for the reserve in October 2008 by FIGC. In 2009–10 and 2010–11 Serie D, he scored 15 goals each, as the joint 4th and 4th top-scorer of Group E of 2009–10 season and 2010–11 season respectively.

In summer 2011 he was signed by the fourth division club Bellaria. He scored 10 times in his first fully professional season. On 28 June 2012 Serie B club Cesena signed him along with teammate Marco Mariani, which the coach of Bellaria at that time, Nicola Campedelli, is the brother of Cesena president Igor.

In July 2012 he was loaned to the third division club Tritium. On 9 January 2013 he left for the fourth division club Borgo-a-Buggiano along with former Bellaria teammate Daniele Forte from Cesena directly. He did not score any goal in 2012–13 season.

In August 2013 Fioretti returned to Bellaria along with Cesena teammate Nicola Del Pivo.

On 31 January 2014 Fioretti was signed by Mantova F.C. in co-ownership deal. The club qualified to 2014–15 Serie C as the 8th of Group A of 2013–14 Lega Pro Seconda Divisione.

On 23 December 2015 Fioretti was signed by A.S.D. Sambenedettese Calcio.

References

External links
 
 AIC profile (data by football.it) 
 Profile at LaSerieD.com 
 

1990 births
Living people
People from Umbertide
Italian footballers
Serie C players
Serie D players
Genoa C.F.C. players
A.C. Bellaria Igea Marina players
A.C. Cesena players
Tritium Calcio 1908 players
S.S.D. Correggese Calcio 1948 players
Mantova 1911 players
Association football forwards
Footballers from Umbria
Sportspeople from the Province of Perugia